Alexander Lam (born 29 July 1998 in New Zealand) is a New Zealand rugby union player who plays for the  in Super Rugby. He was educated at St Peter's College, Auckland. His playing position is wing. He was named in the Blues squad for the 2021 Super Rugby Aotearoa season. He was also a member of the  2020 Mitre 10 Cup squad.

Reference list

External links
itsrugby.co.uk profile

1998 births
New Zealand rugby union players
Living people
Rugby union wings
Auckland rugby union players
Blues (Super Rugby) players
People educated at St Peter's College, Auckland